T. M. Lewin Shirtmaker, commonly known as TM Lewin, is a British online menswear retailer. It was started in 1898 by Thomas Mayes Lewin who opened his first shop on London's Panton Street and later moved to Jermyn Street, renowned as a base for formal shirts. TM Lewin started out making shirts but later started to sell suits, outerwear, knitwear, jackets, chinos, ties and accessories for men.

The company is headquartered in Farringdon, in the London Borough of Islington. By 2020, it had over 150 stores worldwide. TM Lewin went into administration on 30 June 2020, closing its 66 UK stores. Stonebridge Capital bought the company's assets in a pre-pack deal.

History

19th century
The business was founded by Thomas Mayes Lewin on London's Panton Street in 1898, before moving to Jermyn Street in 1903. Lewin has been credited with popularising the modern, button-front shirt. Before that, men pulled shirts on over their heads.

20th century
During the 1900s, Thomas Mayes developed a reputation for design and quality among London's gentlemen. In 1903, Mr Lewin's “coat shirt” was described as a “novel idea” in London Opinion and Today.

During World War I, TM Lewin supplied the RAF and British Army with uniform.

TM Lewin was for a time a partnership between Thomas Mayes Lewin and Geoffrey James Lewin, operating from 39 Panton Street in London. Following retirement, the partnership was dissolved from 1 January 1938, the business continuing as TM Lewin and Sons Ltd.

In 1978, the McKenna family bought TM Lewin. In 1980, future MD Geoff Quinn joined, and helped grow the company so that it had its first £1m year in 1982.

In 1993, the company started an early mail order facility and began moving production from its factory in Southend-on-Sea overseas into Europe.

21st century

2000 saw TM Lewin open its fifth store (at Ludgate Circus in London) and start testing its promotional offers, something that would become a defining characteristic of the brand. It was also awarded the GQ magazine award for 5* shirt.

In 2005, TM Lewin branched out from shirts and started making suits. In the same year, it supplied the ties for the London 2012 Olympic Bid and introduced the 4 for £100 deal.

By 2011, TM Lewin had 99 stores and outlets in Great Britain, one in Northern Ireland and one in the Republic of Ireland. A year later, it launched its first store outside of Europe in Sydney, Australia. Following a 2015 deal with Bain Capital, Sven Gaede took over as CEO in 2018.

In April 2020, the company began talks with potential buyers, as the COVID-19 pandemic jeopardised the retailer's operations. It was reported that rival menswear retailer Charles Tyrwhitt was among a number of parties which submitted offers for TM Lewin. Bain Capital – the private equity group that has been supporting TM Lewin since 2015 through its debt investment arm – was keen to sell the heritage menswear retailer and enlisted corporate finance firm Alantra to conduct an auction. On 13 May 2020, TM Lewin was acquired by Torque Brands, a vehicle of private equity firm Stonebridge Capital.

Around 650 of TM Lewin's 700-strong employees were furloughed under the Coronavirus Job Retention Scheme of the UK government, while the stores remain temporarily closed throughout the pandemic. The 50 unfurloughed employees were active in digital operations and supply chain for TM Lewin. On 30 June 2020, TM Lewin announced the closure of all of its 66 UK shops and the redundancy of 600 workers. Stonebridge bought back the brand's remaining assets, including its online business, in a pre-pack deal after concluding TM Lewin was no longer viable in its current format.

Campaigns

In 2017, Gary Lineker signed up to be the face of TM Lewin. This partnership continued in 2018 and 2019.

TM Lewin has collaborated with several sporting events and teams including Royal Ascot, Harlequins (rugby), and the England and Wales Cricket Board. In May 2021, TM Lewin announced that they had partnered with the British & Irish Lions for the 2021 British & Irish Lions tour to South Africa.

Stores

As of 2019, the company owned 68 stores in the United Kingdom, and 89 based internationally, including in Ireland, Australia, the United States and across Europe.

TM Lewin has collaborated with several brands and mills including Liberty, Loro Piana, Albini and Falke.

References

External links
 

Clothing companies based in London
Clothing companies established in 1898
Clothing retailers of the United Kingdom
Suit makers
Online retailers of the United Kingdom
Shirts